Edward "Ward" Costello (July 5, 1919 - June 4, 2009) was an American actor, composer and lyricist. 

Costello was born in Boston. When he was young, he left home to go to sea, after which he was an itinerant worker on farms and ranches before he became a newspaper reporter in New York.

Costello served in both the British Royal Air Force and the U.S. Army Signal Corps during the Second World War. He received the Silver Star and three Distinguished Flying Crosses. After he left the military, he was a foreign-news editor for CBS in New York.

He composed and wrote the lyrics to the theme for The Gallant Hours. During his acting career, Costello appeared in several television programs, including Star Trek: The Next Generation, Little House on the Prairie and Alfred Hitchcock Presents. He retired from acting in 1989.

Costello was married to actress Loraine Grover, and they had a daughter, Erin.

Costello died from complications of a stroke on June 4, 2009, aged 89. He was survived by his wife, Gerarda; three sons; a daughter; two brothers and a sister.

Selected filmography

 The Secret Storm (1954, TV Series) as Peter Ames #3 (1964–1966)
 The Greatest Gift (1954) as Ned Blackman (1954–1955)
 Hallmark Hall of Fame
 episode The Lark (1957) as Joan's Father
 The Philco Television Playhouse
 episode Run Like a Thief (1954) as Investigator
 Navy Log
 episode Operation Hideout (1957) as Varick
 The Alcoa Hour
 episode Mechanical Manhunt (1957) as Charlie
 Kraft Television Theatre
 episode Vengeance (1957)
 Suspicion
 episode Heartbeat (1957)
 Terror from the Year 5000 (1958) as Dr. Robert Hedges
 Alfred Hitchcock Presents
 episode Murder Me Twice (1958) as William G. Burke
 The Gallant Hours (1960) as Capt. Harry Black
 The Defenders
 episode Our Lady Ironsides (1963) as Tom Aufderheidie
 Petrocelli
 episode Six Strings of Guilt (1976) as Thomas Barnes
 Law of the Land (1976, TV Movie) as E.J. Barnes
 Most Wanted
 episode The SKy Killer (1976) as Andrew Harris
 The Streets of San Francisco
 episode Judgment Day (1976) as Judge Amos Abrams
 episode The Thrill Killers: Part 1 (1976) as Capt. Roy Devitt, SFPD
 episode Hang Tough (1977) as Captain Devitt, SFPD
 MacArthur (1977) as Gen. George C. Marshall
 Police Story
 episode Day of Terror, Night of Fear (1978)
 Return from Witch Mountain (1978) as Mr. Clearcole
 Barnaby Jones
 episode Dangerous Gambit (1976) as Charles Markwell
 episode Death of a Friendship (1978) as Daniel McKnight
 Goldengirl (1979) as Cobb
 Little House on the Prairie	
 episode Portrait of Love (1980) as Jeremy Unger
 Bloody Birthday (1981) as Mr. Taylor
 Whose Life Is It Anyway? (1981) as Mr. Eden
 General Hospital (1963-1989, TV Series) as Martin Drake
 Missing (1982) as Congressman
 Firefox (1982) as Gen. Rogers
 Project X (1987) as Price
 Star Trek: The Next Generation
 episode Coming of Age (1988) as Admiral Gregory Quinn
 episode Conspiracy (1988) as Admiral Gregory Quinn
 episode Shades of Gray (1989) as Admiral Gregory Quinn (archive footage)
 Newhart
 episode Cupcake on My Back (1989) as Mr. Wallingford
 Roe vs. Wade (1989, TV Movie) (final film role)

References

External links
 
 StarTrek.com Profile of Admiral Gregory Quinn

1919 births
2009 deaths
American male composers
American male film actors
American lyricists
American male television actors
Male actors from Boston
20th-century American composers
20th-century American male actors
20th-century American male musicians